(Praised be the Lord, my God),  is a church cantata by Johann Sebastian Bach. It is a chorale cantata performed on Trinity Sunday 8 June 1727 in Leipzig. Rediscovery of the printed libretto of the cantata in the first decade of the 21st century led to a re-appraisal of prior assumptions regarding the early performance chronology of a few cantatas, including this one.

The text of the cantata is a general praise of the Trinity, without a reference to a specific gospel reading. Addressing God the Creator, the Saviour and the Comforter, it could be used for other occasions such as Reformation Day. The cantata is festively scored and ends in a chorale fantasia, like the Christmas Oratorio.

History and words 
The cantata was apparently composed for Trinity Sunday. Originally it was thought the cantata may have been performed as early as 16 June 1726. In his second year Bach had composed chorale cantatas between the first Sunday after Trinity of 1724 and Palm Sunday 1725, but for Easter that year he had returned to cantatas on more varied texts, possibly because he lost his librettist. Later Bach composed again chorale cantatas which may have been intended to complete his second annual cycle. This cantata was possibly one of such completing works. Rediscovery of the printed libretto of the cantata in the first decade of the 21st century led to a re-appraisal of prior assumptions regarding the first performance of this cantata: it was performed on Trinity Sunday 8 June 1727. The cantata may also have been performed on Reformation Day.

The cantata is based entirely on the unchanged words on the hymn  (1665) by Johann Olearius and celebrates the Trinity in five stanzas. The prescribed readings for Trinity Sunday were from the Epistle to the Romans, reflecting "depth of wisdom", and from the Gospel of John, the meeting of Jesus and Nicodemus.

Scoring and structure 
The cantata in five movements is festively scored for three soloists, soprano, alto and bass, a four-part choir, three trumpets, timpani, flauto traverso, two oboes, oboe d'amore, two violins, viola, and basso continuo.

 Coro: 
 Aria (bass): 
 Aria (soprano): 
 Aria (alto): 
 Chorale:

Music 
The opening chorus on the first stanza of the chorale begins with a concerto of all the instruments as a ritornello. The trumpets highlight occasionally the interplay of strings and woodwinds.
 is sung by the soprano, while the other voices sing sometimes in imitation, sometimes in homophony. The text is a praise of the God the Creator.

The following three movements are all arias. In the first aria the bass praises God the Saviour, accompanied only by the continuo. The word "" (praised) is set as an expressive melisma. In the second aria the soprano, accompanied by flute and violin, praises God the Comforter. In the third aria the alto is accompanied by an oboe d'amore in song-like general praise. John Eliot Gardiner suggests that the "pastoral dance" was "inspired, perhaps in its imagery, by the concept of "" (praised by all things that move in the air). The final chorale is set in a joyful concerto of the instruments, similar to the conclusions of Bach's Christmas Oratorio and Ascension Oratorio. Gardiner calls it "punctuated by brass and orchestral fanfares." By this festive ending Bach marked Trinity Sunday as the conclusion of the first part of the liturgical year.

Recordings 
 J. S. Bach: Cantatas BWV 119 & BWV 129, Diethard Hellmann, Bach-Chor Mainz, Bach-Orchester Mainz, Lotte Wolf-Matthäus, Ursula Buckel, Margrit Conrad, Carl-Heinz Müller, Cantate 1968
 Bach Cantatas Vol. 3 – Ascension Day, Whitsun, Trinity, Karl Richter, Münchener Bach-Chor, Münchener Bach-Orchester, Edith Mathis, Anna Reynolds, Peter Schreier, Dietrich Fischer-Dieskau, Archiv Produktion 1975
 Die Bach Kantate Vol. 10, Helmuth Rilling, Gächinger Kantorei, Bach-Collegium Stuttgart, Arleen Augér, Gabriele Schreckenbach, Philippe Huttenlocher, Hänssler 1982
 J. S. Bach: Das Kantatenwerk – Sacred Cantatas Vol. 7, Gustav Leonhardt, Knabenchor Hannover, Collegium Vocale Gent, Leonhardt-Consort, Sebastian Hennig (soloist of the Knabenchor Hannover), René Jacobs, Max van Egmond, Teldec 1983
 Bach Cantatas Vol. 27: Blythburgh/Kirkwell, John Eliot Gardiner, Monteverdi Choir, English Baroque Soloists, Ruth Holton, Daniel Taylor, Peter Harvey, Soli Deo Gloria 2000
 J. S. Bach: Complete Cantatas Vol. 19, Ton Koopman, Amsterdam Baroque Orchestra & Choir, Johannette Zomer, Bogna Bartosz, Christoph Prégardien, Klaus Mertens, Antoine Marchand 2002
 J. S. Bach: Cantatas Vol. 45 (Cantatas from Leipzig 1725), Masaaki Suzuki, Bach Collegium Japan, Yukari Nonoshita, Robin Blaze, Peter Kooy, BIS 2009

References

Sources 
 
 
 Gelobet sei der Herr, mein Gott BWV 129; BC A 93 / Chorale cantata (Trinity Sunday) Bach Digital
 Cantata BWV 129 Gelobet sei der Herr, mein Gott history, scoring, sources for text and music, translations to various languages, discography, discussion, Bach Cantatas Website
 BWV 129 Gelobet sei der Herr, mein Gott English translation, University of Vermont
 BWV 129 Gelobet sei der Herr, mein Gott text, scoring, University of Alberta
 Luke Dahn: BWV 129.5 bach-chorales.com

Church cantatas by Johann Sebastian Bach
1726 compositions
Chorale cantatas